Paul M. Horn (born August 16, 1946) is an American computer scientist and solid state physicist who has made contributions to pervasive computing, pioneered the use of copper and self-assembly in chip manufacturing, and he helped manage the development of deep computing, an important tool that provides business decision makers with the ability to analyze and develop solutions to very complex and difficult problems.

Horn was elected a member of the National Academy of Engineering in 2007 for leadership in the development of information technology products, ranging from microelectronics to supercomputing.

Early life and education
Horn was born on August 16, 1946, and graduated from Clarkson University in 1968 with a Bachelor of Science degree. He obtained his PhD from the University of Rochester in physics in 1973.

Career
Horn has, at various times, been Senior Vice President of the IBM Corporation and executive director of Research. While at IBM, he initiated the project to develop Watson, the computer that competed successfully in the quiz show Jeopardy!.

He is currently a New York University (NYU) Distinguished Scientist in Residence and NYU Stern Executive in Residence. He is also a professor at NYU Tandon School of Engineering. In 2009, he was appointed as the Senior Vice Provost for Research at NYU.

Awards
 Industrial Research Institute (IRI) Medal in honor of his contributions to technology leadership, 2005
 American Physical Society, George E. Pake Prize, 2002
 Hutchison Medal from the University of Rochester, 2002
 Distinguished Leadership award from the New York Hall of Science, 2000
 Bertram Eugene Warren Award from the American Crystallographic Association, 1988

References

External links 
 IBM Bio

1946 births
Living people
Clarkson University alumni
New York University faculty
American computer scientists
Computer hardware researchers
Computer systems researchers
IBM employees
Members of the United States National Academy of Engineering
Polytechnic Institute of New York University faculty
Fellows of the American Physical Society